is a Japanese short animation that served as intermission for Toho Cinemas' animated films at Shinjuku, Tokyo from 2015 to 2016. The anime follows the rapid-fire chit-chat of "charming characters" in an anime club at the Tokyo University. An anime television series based on the short and titled  aired from October 8 to December 24, 2017.

Characters

Animegataris

A girl who just recently began watching anime. She wants to reopen the inactive anime club, even though she is still unfamiliar with anime. She is Maya's younger sister.

A girl with an  manner but she is actually an otaku who likes  characters.

Minoa's friend who likes to read light novels before watching their anime adaptations. She often clashes with Arisu on differences of opinion.

A member of the anime club and an eccentric. His particular interest is in media typically associated with chuunibyou, and is a  himself. He generally looks nerdy, but when he takes his glasses off he is considered very handsome. He has a crush on Miko.

A member of the anime club and an upperclassman. He, like Neko-sensei, actually came from the Anime World, and his real name is pronounced Aurora; he came to the real world to acquire the power to change it into his preferred pronunciation.

 A talking cat from the secret room in the anime club.

A new member who is not familiar with anime. In , Maya is a third year high student and Minoa's older sister.

A girl who seems to be a normie outside, but is actually an otaku. In , Erika is a third year student at Sakaneko High School and the president of anime research club.

Other

Tsubaki is the Student Council President at Sakaneko High School and used to be Erika's childhood friend. Now that Tsubaki considers Erika to be a nuisance, she is determined to have the anime club shut down at any cost.

Student Council Vice-President.

Sakeneko High School student council Treasurer.

The anime club's advisor.

Yui's homeroom teacher and supervisor of the sports club.

Principal

The principal of Sakaneko High School. He is a former member of the anime club and creator of the anime "Eternal Symphony" that Minoa loves so much. However it was canceled after the first episode due to the fans' critiques, hence why he wants to shut down the current anime club.

 An otaku girl and exchange student from Beijing, China. She met Minoa during the Otacon and also goes to the same school as her sister.

Minoa and Maya's Father. He is an otaku but hides it to keep his perfect father image to his daughters (which he fails).

Minoa and Maya's Mother. She has no problem revealing her husband is an otaku.

Anime
The short animation served as an intermission for Toho Cinemas animated films at Shinjuku from 2015 to 2016. The anime follows the rapid-fire chit-chat of "charming characters" in an anime club at the Tokyo University.

An anime television series partially served as the prequel aired from October 8 to December 24, 2017. Crunchyroll streamed the series while Funimation streamed a simuldub.

References

External links
 
 Official website 
  

2017 anime television series debuts
Anime with original screenplays
Comedy anime and manga
Funimation
School life in anime and manga
Slice of life anime and manga
Television shows based on light novels
Television shows set in Asia
Television shows set in Japan
Television shows set in Tokyo
Tokyo in fiction